

Massacres

See also 
 Human rights in Mexico

References 

Massacres
Mexico

Massacres